Edis Kusturica (born 6 February 1953) is a Bosnian entrepreneur, lawyer and former 37th president of the assembly of FK Sarajevo, taking charge of the club from his predecessor Alen Hujić.

Executive director of the Sarajevo-based Vakufska banka, he served on the board of FK Sarajevo since 2011, as well as being one of the authors of the club's new statute that was voted in during 2012, paving the way for Malaysian businessman and investor Vincent Tan to buy the club in December of the next year. Furthermore, he instigated the building of elite training facilities for the club in the Sarajevo suburb of Butmir, which are currently under construction as of May 2015. His cousin Feđa Kusturica, a high-ranking bank officer at Scotiabank and its vice president for the Asia-Pacific Region is also an FK Sarajevo board member.

References

1953 births
Living people
Businesspeople from Sarajevo
Bosniaks of Bosnia and Herzegovina
Bosnia and Herzegovina chairpersons of corporations
FK Sarajevo presidents of the assembly